Božo Kovačević (born 24 December 1979 in Vienna) is an Austrian footballer of Serbian descent, who currently plays for SK Vorwärts Steyr.

Club career
Kovačević came to Austria Wien at 15 and started his professional career there at 19, only to be loaned out to Second Division SC Untersiebenbrunn in 2001. He joined SV Pasching a year later and made it with them into the national team. In 2007, he moved to SV Ried.

International career
He made his debut for Austria in an October 2002 European Championship qualification match against Belarus. He earned 7 caps, no goals scored. His last international was a September 2006 friendly match against Venezuela.

External links
Player profile - SV Ried
Profile - Austria Archive

1979 births
Living people
Footballers from Vienna
Association football midfielders
Austrian footballers
Austria international footballers
FK Austria Wien players
SV Ried players
FC Juniors OÖ players
Austrian Football Bundesliga players